Tony Särkkä (15 December 1972 – 8 February 2017), who went by the stage name It, was a Swedish multi-instrumentalist who has played in many black metal bands. He played guitar, drums and bass guitar as well as doing vocals. He was joined by Jim Berger in many projects.

Särkkä's projects included Abruptum, Ophthalamia, Vondur, Incision, Brejn Dedd, War and 8th Sin. He also contributed guest vocals to Dissection's second album Storm of the Light's Bane, and to Marduk's third album Opus Nocturne. He was the founder of The True Satanist Horde in Sweden. 

Särkkä died on 8 February 2017, aged 44, but his death was only officially announced on 14 February by his sister, via her brother's Facebook page.

References

External links

1972 births
2017 deaths
Black metal musicians
Swedish heavy metal guitarists
Swedish heavy metal singers
Swedish people of Finnish descent
Ophthalamia members